Aloe aldabrensis (the "Aldabra Aloe", previously Lomatophyllum aldabrensis) is a species of Aloe endemic to the islands of Aldabra in the Indian Ocean, where it can still be found in coastal scrub on limestone-based soil.

Description
It is part of a group of aloes which bear fleshy berries, and were therefore classed as a separate group, Lomatophyllum. Within this group it is most closely related to Aloe pembana and Aloe alexandrei - both also from islands in the Mozambique channel - as well as Aloe peyrierasii from the north east corner of Madagascar. These species are also more distantly related to Aloe purpurea of Mauritius, but differ by their larger leaves, longer flowers, and more widely interspaced leaf-teeth.

The Aldabra aloe usually grows singly, close to the ground, with at most a short stem. Its leaves are green with red or orange tints. Its multi-branched inflorescence bears orange-red flowers in racemes, and its seeds develop in fleshy berries.

References

aldabrensis
Endemic flora of Seychelles
Endangered flora of Africa